Tseng Chang (18 May 1930 – 25 January 2021) was a Chinese actor. He participated in the films Xiang xi shi Wang, Yu ya gon wu and 2012, with John Cusack, Chiwetel Ejiofor, Amanda Peet and Thandiwe Newton.

On 25 January 2021, he died at Richmond Hospital, Richmond, British Columbia, Canada, aged 90.

Filmography 
8 Minutes Ahead
Final Recipe
Arrow
Gunlow
2012 (film)
Romaine par moins 30
Christmas Cottage
Sobrenatural
Dim Sum Funeral
Whistler
They Wait
Novio por una noche
Sai Gon nhat thuc
Dragon Boys
Intelligence
Everything's Gone Green
The Game of Strangers
Regenesis
Reefer Madness: The Musical Movie
Adolescent's Diaries
The Murdoch Mysteries
Zi yu zi le
Kingdom Hospital
Betraying Reason
Long Life, Happiness & Prosperity
Da Vinci's Inquest
The Miracle of the Cards
L'or
Walking Shadow
Lunch with Charles
Turn It Up
Dr. Jekyll and Mr. Hyde
7 Days
These Arms of Mine
Night Man
Breaker High
Ninja Turtles: The Next Mutation
Nu ren si shi
Xiang xi shi Wang
Yu ya gong wu
Qi an shi lu bai se tong dao
Bullet to the Heat
As Tears Go By
Ba shi qi yu jie liang yuan
Qu Yuan
Yi bang rou
Hsi nou ai le
Wo di yi jia
Shuang nu qing qe
Zhen zhu feng yun
Ying chun hua
Xi Shi
Yan yu
Fen hong se de meng
Jin ying
Na na nu nu
Wu hu hiang
Xue di qing chou
Lei yu
Wang lao wu zhi lian
Ji ling gui yu xiao lai mao
Mi ren de jia qi
Xiao mi qu shi
Lan hua hua
You nu huai chun
Xiang xiang pen xiao jie
Ming Feng
Hong deng long
Lian feng he ming
Mei gui yan
Nu zi gong yu
Shao nu de fan nao
Bu yao li kai wo
Du hui jiao xiang qu
Jue dai jia ren
Cun cao xin
Nie hai hua
Hua hua shi jie

References

External links 

1930 births
2021 deaths
American male film actors
American male television actors
Chinese emigrants to the United States
Male actors from Beijing